Evan John Jones (October 23, 1872 – January 9, 1952) was a Republican member of the U.S. House of Representatives from Pennsylvania.

Biography
Jones was born in Shamokin, Pennsylvania. He graduated from Clarion Normal School in Clarion, Pennsylvania, in 1892. He taught school. He graduated from the Dickinson School of Law in 1896. He was admitted to the bar in 1896 and commenced practice at St. Marys, Pennsylvania.

Jones was elected as a Republican to the Sixty-sixth and Sixty-seventh Congresses. He was an unsuccessful candidate for renomination in 1922. He resumed the practice of law in Bradford, Pennsylvania.

He served as vice president and general manager of the Emporium Forestry Co. and as director and general counsel of the Grasse River Railroad Corp.

He died at the age of seventy-nine in Bradford, Pennsylvania, and was buried in the Willow Dale Cemetery.

References

The Political Graveyard

1872 births
1952 deaths
Pennsylvania lawyers
People from Bradford, Pennsylvania
Clarion University of Pennsylvania alumni
Dickinson School of Law alumni
Republican Party members of the United States House of Representatives from Pennsylvania